The national symbols of Laos are official and unofficial flags, icons or cultural expressions that are emblematic, representative or otherwise characteristic of Laos and of its culture.

Symbol

References 

National symbols of Laos